Miss Fear (or simply, Fear) was a recurring character in Blackhawk comics (published by Quality Comics, later bought by DC Comics) between 1946 and 1948.  Her first appearance in Modern Comics #49 (May, 1946) told her origin as daughter of the slain leader of an obscure nation in central Asia.  When Blackhawk and his men arrived to investigate the murder, they found Fear always a half-step ahead on her vendetta, ruthlessly avenging her father with a Tommy gun.

Further Golden Age appearances by Miss Fear included Blackhawk Comics issues 13, 14, 17, 19, 20, and 22 (December, 1948).  In these stories she developed a distinctly romantic yet seemingly unrequited interest in Blackhawk, meanwhile involving and assisting the team in various cases and missions, usually in central Asia.  Fear displayed an impressive array of skills including flying, horsemanship, martial arts, and wielding a bullwhip, as well as crack marksmanship.  The conclusion of the final story, however, seemed to imply that she was resigned to disappointment in carrying a torch for Blackhawk.

In 1998, Miss Fear returned in a somewhat different form in the four-issue miniseries Guns of the Dragon, by Timothy Truman, starring Enemy Ace and Bat Lash.  Set in China, 1927, this story depicted her as a young, half-Chinese / half-Caucasian spy in service of the communists.  The plot also involved a recurring Blackhawk villain, the Thunderer, as well as a brief appearance by Chop-Chop, although his age at that point seems impossible to reconcile with his later career as Blackhawk's sidekick.  The outcome of the adventure led Fear to reconsider her loyalty to the communists and suggested her future as a freelance freedom-fighter.  However, her only subsequent appearance thus far has been in the form of a limited edition 1/6 scale G.I. Joe action figure, produced by Dreams & Visions in 2003, licensed by Hasbro and DC Comics.

References
Steranko, James.  The Steranko History of Comics, Vol. 2 (Supergraphics, 1972), p. 57.

Comics characters introduced in 1946
DC Comics female superheroes
DC Comics superheroes
Quality Comics superheroes
Fictional female martial artists
Female characters in comics